Monk. (1964) is the fourth studio album Thelonious Monk released on Columbia Records, and his seventh album overall for that label.  It features two original compositions and several jazz standards.

The track "Pannonica" is a tribute to the jazz patron Pannonica de Koenigswarter.

The track "Teo" is a tribute to the album's producer Teo Macero.

The album cover is a photo of Monk taken by W. Eugene Smith in 1959. Between 1957 and 1965, Monk and other prominent New York jazz musicians rehearsed at the photographer's home, nicknamed 'The Jazz Loft'.

Track listing
Side One
"Liza (All the Clouds'll Roll Away)" (Gershwin, Kahn, Gershwin) - (4:35)
"April in Paris" (Harburg, Duke) - (7:52)
"Children's Song (That Old Man)" (public domain) - (4:55)
"I Love You (Sweetheart of All My Dreams)" (Art Fitch, Bert Lowe, Kay Fitch) - (6:45)
Side Two
"Just You, Just Me" (Greer, Klages) - (8:42)
"Pannonica" (Monk) - (7:21)
"Teo" (Monk) - (5:24)

"I Love You (Sweetheart of All My Dreams)" was misidentified as the Irving Berlin song "(Just One Way to Say) I Love You" through its 1980's releases.  It is identified correctly on its 2018 rerelease.

Personnel
Piano - Thelonious Monk
Bass - Larry Gales
Drums - Ben Riley 
Producer - Teo Macero 
Tenor saxophone - Charlie Rouse
Liner notes - Bill Evans

References

Thelonious Monk albums
1964 albums
Columbia Records albums
Albums produced by Teo Macero